Jyrki Louhi is a retired Finnish professional ice hockey forward who played for HPK and Jokerit in the SM-liiga.

References

Living people
HPK players
Year of birth missing (living people)
Finnish ice hockey forwards